Paul Ngozi (1949–1989), born Paul Dobson Nyirongo, was a Zambian musician who was prominent in the Zambian music scene in the 1970s and 1980s. He first became popular as the band leader of the Ngozi Family, a top local rock group which was one of the first groups to have its music classified as Zamrock.

He earned his place as a ‘sharp’ social commentator because the themes of his music were usually very close to society’s own lives and therefore easy to relate to.

Discography

Studio albums
 Day Of Judgment (1976)
 Viva Ngozi (1976)
 45,000 Volts (1977)
 99% Confusion (1977) 
 Bad Character (1977)
 Heavy = Metal (1977)
 In The Ghetto (1977) 
 Lightning And Thunder (1977)
 Happy Trip (1978)
 Heavy Connection (1978)
 The Best of Paul Ngozi (1979)
 Size 9 (1981)
 Thokozile (1983)

Selected singles 
 "Bauze"
 "Give Me A Hand"
 "Half Mwenye-Half Muntu"
 "I've been looking for you"/"We were not told"
 "Kanyamata"
 "Kunali kamwana"
 "Kunisebanya"
 "Mulandu Wa Damage"
 "Musizani Yomunde"
 "Nshaupwa bwino"
 "Nyagondwe"
 "Size Nine"
 "Sooka iyo"
 "Sunka mulamu"
 ""
 "Tikondane"
 "Ulemu"
 "Vikwati Vapa Telephone"
 "Vina bwela mo chedwa"
 "Yowowa"
 "Rhoda"

In Culture 

The song "Hold On" is featured in Season One Episode Five of the Series Poker Face.

See also 

 Music of Zambia
 Zamrock

References 
  Most popular Zambians
  YouTube

External links 
Radio Diffusion 

1948 births
1989 deaths
20th-century Zambian male singers
People from Lusaka

Now-Again Records artists